30 Foot Fall (stylized as 30footFALL) is an American punk rock band that began in Houston, Texas.

History
The band played their first show on Mother's Day in 1993 and were composed of Rubio Cisneros (Drummer), Mitch (bassist) Tony Avitia (Guitar), Butch Klotz (Vocals). Shortly after releasing their first two demos, Mitch left the Houston area to get married, moving Cisneros to bass. Damon DeLaPaz filled in the drum position, while Ativia left the group to start I-45 and Chris LaForge of I-End Result picked up as guitarist. Touring Houston, Dallas, and Austin, 30 Foot Fall's popularity grew; they started as openers for larger bands such as Screeching Weasel and Sum-41 among others.

After making several demos, 30 Foot Fall released several albums on various record labels starting with Elementary School Love 7, released in 1994 by Yo Mama's Records. In 1995, on Fuzzgun Records, they released their first studio album Divided We Stand. In 1996 they also released their second EP, Junior High Sucked 7. After hearing a demo, Bob Becker of Fearless Records signed 30 Foot Fall to a record deal and in 1997 produced their next album Acme-143.

The band toured extensively alongside other notable bands such as Bigwig and Diesel Boy.. They released the EPs Unrealism and Cartoons in 1997 and 1998, respectively. Two of the three songs from Cartoons were included on their next album. At this time, DeLaPaz received a record deal offer with MCA Records for his other band Fenix*TX and moved to California. Brian Davis of Middlefinger was brought in to replace him.

In 1999, the band released their most successful album, Ever Revolving, Never Evolving, on Nitro Records. The release was followed by numerous shows including a tour with The Vandals. Despite being at the height of their popularity, 30footFALL went on hiatus after the conclusion of their 1999 tour, citing the need to spend more time with family. Chris LaForge left the band at this time to seek other musical ventures. Jason Davis, brother of drummer Brian Davis) and formerly of Middlefinger, was brought on to play guitar when they resumed playing locally in spring of 2000. This line-up recorded The Doppler Effect in 2002. At this time, 30footFALL chose not to tour for the new album. Instead, the band chose to play occasional Houston/Dallas/Austin shows and their annual 30footFALL Christmas show at Fitzgerald's in Houston, TX.  In 2003, they released 10yearsandstillFALLING, a live album which documents their ten years as a band.

At their 2005 Christmas Show, Klotz announced that he would be moving to Virginia, ending his 12 years in the Houston punk scene. He also announced LaForge would return as guitarist in 2006, making the band a 5 piece for the first time.

On December 25, 2010, at their 16th annual Christmas Show, the band self-released their Jesus, Elvis, and Richard Petty EP, which was their first studio release since 2002's The Doppler Effect. In 2012, 30footFALL were featured in When We Ruled H-Town, which documents Houston punk bands and their rise to popularity in the 1990s.

On June 30, 2014, Klotz announced that he would be returning to Houston after nearly nine years in Virginia. 30footFALL acknowledged this and planned a show for August 30, 2014 at Fitzgerald's. The band played a brief set in October at The Continental Club with former drummer Damon DeLaPaz, excluding Jason and Brian Davis, thus recreating their original line up.

In March 2015, 30footFALL unveiled two new songs at a show at Griff's Bar, entitled "Champion Song" and "National Treasure." Another song, "Maybe You Could Be The One", was debuted soon after. They began playing more shows over the next few years, including the Remember the Punks Festival in October 2016 and opening up for Screeching Weasel in early 2017.

Chris LaForge died unexpectedly following a stroke at age 42 on May 29, 2017. His final show with the band was at the Nightingale Room in April 2017. Despite uncertainty regarding their future, 30footFALL played their scheduled June show at Saint Arnold's brewery with Skeleton Dick guitarist Chris Vasquez and Arnett Vaughn filling in on guitars.

While playing a brief tour with Bigwig in October 2017, it was announced that Chris Vasquez had officially replaced LaForge on lead guitar. 30footFALL confirmed they will release a new album and that LaForge's guitar tracks will be featured. The first single from their new album is titled "Champion Song" and was released on October 27. 30footFALL held a memorial show for LaForge in March 2018, and held their final Christmas show that year due to the closure of Fitzgerald's in early 2019.

30footFALL played their first show in three years on June 11, 2022 at Southside Skate Park in Houston, as part of a benefit to donate to children with heart defects. They next played on September 30th at Trip Six, playing new material. The Christmas show made a comeback after four years at Number's Nightclub that December.

On November 28th, they announced they had officially signed with People of Punk Rock Records, with their first releases on the label being a vinyl, CD, and cassette reissue of The Doppler Effect, along with a similar reissue for the rare 10yearsandstillFALLING live album from 2003.

30footFALL will play a set as Bickley for the 2023 You Ain't Punk show in January at Black Magic Social Club.

Band members
Current
 James "Butch" Klotz – lead vocals (1993–present)
 Chris Vasquez – guitars (2017–present)
 Jason Davis – guitars (1999–present)
 Rubio Cisneros – bass (1994–present); drums (1993-1994)
 Brian Davis – drums (1998–present)
Former
 Tony Avitia - guitars  (1993-1994)
 Mitch- bass  (1993-1994)
 Damon DeLaPaz - drums (1994-1998)
 Chris "Delron" LaForge - guitars (1994-1999, 2006–2017; died 2017)

Timeline

Discography
Neartown Demo (Fallin'Down Productions, 1993)
30footFALL Demo (Broken Note Records, 1994)
Elementary School Love EP (Yo Mama's Records, 1994)
Divided We Stand (Fuzzgun Records, 1995)/Fearless Records, 1998)
Junior High Sucked EP (Twistworthy Records, 1996)
Acme-143 (Fearless Records, 1997)
Unrealism EP (Function Productions, 1997)
Cartoons EP (Paranoid Records, 1998)
Ever Revolving, Never Evolving (Nitro Records, 1999)
The Doppler Effect (It's Opposite Day And I Love You Records, 2002) (People of Punk Rock Records, 2022)
10yearsandstillFALLING Live (It's Opposite Day And I Love You Records, 2003) (People of Punk Rock Records, 2022)
Jesus, Elvis, and Richard Petty EP (It's Opposite Day And I Love You Records, 2010)
Champion Song (Single) (It's Opposite Day And I Love You Records, 2017)

References

External links
AllMusic
Discogs

Punk rock groups from Texas
Musical groups from Houston
Musical groups established in 1993
Fearless Records artists